Leeds University Library's Gypsy, Traveller and Roma Collections are one of the five Designated collections held by the Brotherton Library at the University of Leeds. They comprise an extensive range of international books, manuscripts and archives relating to Gypsy, Traveller and Roma culture.  Most of the collections are not about or by the communities but relate to the way they have been represented in the past.

The Collections started in 1950 when the poet and dramatist, Dorothy Una Ratcliffe, donated her archive material and printed books and pamphlets to Leeds University Library.

In 2020 the printed materials include over 3,500 published works.  Archive material covers letters, research papers, press-cuttings, artwork, photographs and case files. The collections date from 16th century to the modern day.  The Gypsy, Traveller and Roma Collections are located in Special Collections in the Brotherton Library, University of Leeds.

Designation 
In 2005 the Gypsy, Traveller and Roma Collections were designated by the Museums, Libraries and Archives Council. The Designation Scheme is a mark of distinction which recognises collections in non-national institutions of outstanding national and international importance for users. The scheme is now administered by the Arts Council England.

The Gypsy, Traveller and Roma Collections are one of five Designated collections held by Special Collections at Leeds University Library. The library holds five Designated collections.

History

Overview 

The Gypsy, Traveller and Roma Collections comprise collections from different sources acquired by the Brotherton Library at various times.  These are curated under a single collection group.  Each collection is an outsider’s representation of the communities as the collectors were not Gypsies, Travellers or Roma.  As a whole the collections trace attitudes to, and relationships with, the communities, from the romantic stance of the early twentieth century to the social reality of more modern collections.

The Gypsy, Traveller and Roma Collections relate to communities with a nomadic culture, history or lifestyle.  The communities represented include those recognised in UK law as ethnic groups; English and Welsh (Romany) Gypsies, Irish Travellers and Scottish Travellers.  They also embrace non-ethnic groups that consider themselves distinct e.g. New Travellers, Showmen and Bargees. ‘Gypsy' may be considered offensive outside of the UK, so ‘Roma’ is often the preferred term representing a number of distinct groups such as Sinti and Manouche.

The Romany Collection 
The Romany Collection was donated by Dorothy Una Ratcliffe in 1950.  It includes manuscripts, letters, typescripts, press cuttings, photographs, musical scores, artwork and objects featuring Gypsies and Travellers in the UK and worldwide. Many of the archives relate to the Gypsy Lore Society and  its members.  The papers reflect the members’ research interests and include articles published in the Journal of the Gypsy Lore Society.

Ratcliffe left a fund to purchase more material to add to the collection.  Additions include individual items and a series of press cuttings from Durrants Press Cuttings Limited.

The fund enabled the purchase of collections created by the following people in the 1970s:

Donald Kenrick (National Gypsy Council) a linguist, author and activist/scholar.
Robert Dawson, author/educationalist.
T. W. Thompson, headmaster and collector of Gypsy and Traveller folklore, Gypsy Lore Society member.
 Reverend George Hall, Rector of Ruckland, author, Gypsy Lore Society member.

Later donations 
In 2001 the collection of Sir Angus Fraser author and scholar was bequeathed to the Library.  More recent additions include the collections of the activists Jenny Smith, Bristol area Councillor and Labour Campaigner for Traveller Rights, and Diana Allen, Solicitor and Rights Campaigner.

Introductory video 
In 2017 the Leeds Gypsy and Traveller Exchange (GATE) community collaborated with Special Collections to create a short video introduction to the collections.

New acquisitions 
Leeds University Library acquires books and archives to enhance the Gypsy, Traveller and Roma Collections.

Collections and Highlights

Sir Angus Fraser Collection 

The collection was bequeathed in December 2001.  It includes personal papers, manuscripts, correspondence, research material and printed works referencing Gypsies, Travellers and Roma in UK and Europe. Many were collected by Sir Angus Fraser in his post of assistant editor of the Gypsy Lore Society. He acquired others in the course of researching his book 'The Gypsies (The Peoples of Europe)' 1995.

The subjects of the papers include national legislation in European countries, history, language/dialects, culture, religion, The Holocaust [Porajmos], Romani studies and the work of the Gypsy Lore Society.

A highlight of the collection is the large amount of official Spanish documents dating from 16th and 17th century which relate to laws applying to "Gitanos" [Roma] in Spain.

Jenny Smith Collection 
The Collection consists of material created and collected by Jenny Smith in the course of her work campaigning on behalf of Gypsies and Travellers in Bristol area and around the UK. It includes papers on UK and European laws and policies and their impact on the lives of Gypsies and Travellers. New (Age) Travellers, that is, non-ethnic Travellers who adopt a nomadic lifestyle feature in particular.

Donald Kenrick Collection 
The focus of the collection is on material from the 1960s and 1970s related to the establishment of the Gypsy Council in 1966 and its activities. Donald Kenrick also deposited a considerable number of books and pamphlets referencing Gypsies, Travellers and Roma.

T. W. Thompson Collection 
Thomas William Thompson (1888-1968) was a prominent collector of Gypsy and Traveller folklore particularly in the North of England and Midlands from 1915.  Thompson recorded information related to him by Gypsies and Travellers in two series of notebooks.  The topics covered by his notes include language, customs, biographies and the genealogy of particular family groups.

Research and Outreach

Research Topics 
The Gypsy, Traveller and Roma Collections offer a wealth of research opportunities; covering subjects such as art, literature, history, culture, language/linguistics, philology, sociology, religion, law, politics, human rights, activism and geography.

Recent Research 
The collections have been used to research the experiences of the community in different parts of Europe including Spain and in the Austro-Hungarian Empire. Many of the collections have been studied to explore Romani contributions to European culture and the singing traditions of the community.  Some researchers have examined the concept of the nomad and nomadic living. The collections have been studied for information about the construction and design of wagons sometimes known as caravans.

Publications 
Numerous publications in the Journal of the Gypsy Lore Society.

‘Mediterranean Gypsies in factsheets in Roma history and culture’, Aresu, Massimo: 2020.

‘Gypsy colours’, Le Bas, Delaine: 23 Nov 2016.

‘The Romany Collections: 10 etchings of gypsy dances’, Banatvala, Oliver: 2017.

In Books 
'The Gypsies; The Peoples of Europe''', Angus McKay Fraser, Blackwell, 1995.'  McKay used the Romany Collection extensively when researching his book.Directory of Rare Books and Special Collections in the UK and Republic of Ireland'', ed. by. Karen Attar, Facet Publishing, 2016.

Exhibitions 
In 2018 an exhibition 'Rights and Romance' in the Treasures of the Brotherton Gallery at the University of Leeds featured archives from the Gypsy, Traveller and Roma Collections.  It was co-curated with Dr Jodie Matthews, a senior lecturer, at the University of Huddersfield. The exhibition included material with historical representations of Gypsies and Travellers by people external to the community, together with contributions from the communities themselves through Leeds Gypsy and Traveller Exchange.  The exhibition led to an international seminar entitled 'Why do we need Romani History'.

Access 
A guide to the Gypsy, Traveller and Roma Collections is available on the Leeds University Library website. This provides an overview to the collections, their history and uses.

References 

University of Leeds
Special collections libraries
Collections
Romani in England
Sinti